Goephanes olivaceus is a species of beetle in the family Cerambycidae. It was described by Breuning in 1938.

References

Goephanes
Beetles described in 1938
Taxa named by Stephan von Breuning (entomologist)